Live in Egypt 1 is a recording by the jazz musician Sun Ra and his Astro-Intergalactic-Infinity Arkestra, documenting their first visit to Egypt.

Tracks 1-4 are from a television broadcast on December 16, 1971 and include an interview with Sun Ra; tracks 5-7 are recordings made at a domestic concert in Heliopolis 4 days previously.

In various editions, the record has sometimes been known by other titles, "Dark Myth Equation Visitation" and "Nature's God"

Track listing
"Discipline 27"
"Solar-Ship Voyage"
"Cosmo-Darkness"
"The Light Thereof"
"Friendly Galaxy No 2"
"To Nature's God"
"Why Go To The Moon?"

Personnel
John Gilmore - tenor saxophone
Danny Davis - alto saxophone, flute
Marshall Allen - alto saxophone, flute, oboe
Kwame Hadi - trumpet, conga drums
Pat Patrick - baritone saxophone
Elo Omoe - bass clarinet
Tommy Hunter - percussion
Danny Ray Thompson - baritone saxophone, flute
June Tyson - vocal
Larry Narthington - alto saxophone, conga drum
Lex Humphries - percussion
Clifford Jarvis - percussion
Hakim Rahim - alto saxophone, flute
Sun Ra - organ, Mini Moog, piano
Tam Fiofori - engineer

References

Sun Ra live albums
1972 live albums
Live free jazz albums
Live free improvisation albums
El Saturn Records live albums